The following list of notable constructed languages is divided into auxiliary, ritual, engineered, and artistic (including fictional) languages, and their respective subgenres. All entries on this list have further information on separate Wikipedia articles.

Auxiliary languages

International auxiliary languages 
International auxiliary languages (IAL) are languages constructed to provide easy, fast, and/or improved communication among all human beings, or a significant portion, without necessarily replacing native languages.

Zonal auxiliary languages 
Zonal auxiliary languages are languages created with the purpose of facilitating communication between speakers of a certain group of related languages. Unlike international auxiliary languages for global uses, they are intended to serve a limited linguistic or geographic area. Examples include Pan-Slavic languages, Pan-Romance languages and Pan-Germanic languages.

Controlled languages
Controlled natural languages are natural languages that have been altered to make them simpler, easier to use, or more acceptable in certain circumstances, such as for use by people who do not speak the original language well. The following projects are examples of controlled English:

Visual languages
Visual languages use symbols or movements in place of the spoken word. Constructed sign languages also fall in this category.

Ritual languages
These are languages in actual religious use by their communities or congregations.

Engineered languages
Engineered languages are devised to test a hypothesis or experiment with innovative linguistic features. They may fall into one or more of three categories: philosophical, experimental and logical.

Others

Artistic/fictional languages

Languages used in fiction

Comic books

Constructed by J. R. R. Tolkien

Tolkien's most prominent languages are:

Film

Games

Internet-based

Music

Television

Other literature

Alternative languages
Some experimental languages were developed to observe hypotheses of alternative linguistic interactions which could have led to very different modern languages. The following two examples were created for Ill Bethisad, an alternate history project.

Personal languages

Constructed languages in Wikipedia 
There is a version of Wikipedia in each of the following nine constructed languages. Eight of these languages are ILAs (international auxiliary languages), while Lojban is an engineered language. Until 2005, there were also versions of Wikipedia in the constructed languages Toki Pona and Klingon, but these have been deleted.

See also
 Alien language
 Constructed script
 Conlanger
 Constructed language
 Engineered language
 Hieroglyph
 International auxiliary language
 Language game
 List of languages
 Rohonc Codex
 Voynich Manuscript
 List of markup languages
 List of extinct languages

References

Further reading
 
 
 Reprinted as: 
 
 
  The sequel to The Language Construction Kit.

External links
 Language analysis from Linguist List

Programming language classification

Languages
Constructed